"Hooked" is a song performed by American boy band Why Don't We. The song was released as a digital download on June 7, 2018 by Signature and Atlantic Records, as the lead single from their debut studio album 8 Letters. The song peaked at number twenty-two on the US Bubbling Under Hot 100 Singles chart.

Music video
A music video to accompany the release of "Hooked" was first released onto YouTube on June 7, 2018. The video was directed by Éli Sokhn. The video depicts the band members in various fantastical dating scenarios (including special agents, video game characters, and giant octopi).

Track listing

Personnel
Credits adapted from Tidal.
 Jacob Manson – Producer, background vocals, bass, drums, guitar, keyboards, programmer, writer
 Paul Sumpter – Acoustic Guitar
 Phil Plested – Background vocals, writer
 Robin Florent – Engineer
 Scott Desmarais – Engineer
 Chris Galland – Mixing Engineer
 Manny Marroquin – Mixing Engineer
 Louis Bell – Vocal Production
 Corbyn Besson – Vocals
 Daniel Seavey – Vocals
 Jack Avery – Vocals
 Jonah Marais – Vocals
 Zach Herron – Vocals

Charts

Certifications

Release history

References

2018 songs
2018 singles
Why Don't We songs